Speed limits in Pakistan are similar to most European countries on newer roads with most highways at , and somewhat higher in the western areas of the country. There are some areas of the country with no enforced speed limit.

The road that travels through the Suleiman Range of Balochistan, as well as the roads that are above Kuchlak towards Razmak have no enforced speed limit. In 2011, a viral video showed a person driving  in front of the police station in Razmak.
Today on 6th Nov, 2022. NHA (National Highway Authority) reduced max speed limit to 100kmp/h on motorway.

References

Speed Limit for LTV(Light Transport Vehicle) is 120
Speed Limit for HTV(Heavy Transport Vehicle) is 110

See also 

Motorways of Pakistan
Transport in Pakistan

Paki
Road transport in Pakistan